Ghinallelia is a genus of thread-legged bugs in the family Reduviidae. There are at least 2 described species in Ghinallelia.

Species
 Ghinallelia globifera (Bergroth, 1906)
 Ghinallelia productilis (Barber, 1914)

References

Further reading

 
 
 

Reduviidae